Inchmahome, an anglicisation of Innis Mo Cholmaig ("my-Colmac's island"), is the largest of three islands in the Lake of Menteith, in Stirlingshire.

History 
Inchmahome is best known as the location of Inchmahome Priory and for the attendant priors of Inchmahome.

The priory was founded in 1238 by the Earl of Menteith, Walter Comyn, for a small community of the Augustinian order (the Black Canons). The Comyn family were one of the most powerful in Scotland at the time, and had an imposing country house on Inch Talla, one of the other islands on the lake. There is some evidence that there was a church on the island before the priory was established.

The priory has a long history of receiving many notable guests. King Robert the Bruce visited three times, in 1306, 1308 and 1310. His visits were likely politically motivated, as the first abbot had sworn allegiance to Edward I, the English King. In 1358 the future King Robert II also stayed at the priory. In 1547 the priory served as a refuge for Mary, Queen of Scots, aged four, hidden here for a few weeks following the disastrous defeat of the Scots army at the Battle of Pinkie Cleugh during the Rough Wooing.

The famous English travel writer, H.V. Morton, visited in the 1930s and wrote:

Although Mary, Queen of Scots, was only on the island for a matter of weeks, at the age of five, fanciful stories have grown up around her on the island. For example, they state that it was here that she started to learn languages, held a mock court with the Four Marys, planted a box hedge and did needle work.

See also

 List of islands of Scotland

References 

Islands of the Lake of Menteith